The New Forest Rustlers was a 6-part children's TV serial made by Southern TV and broadcast by ITV in 1966

Story 
The TV serial was adapted by children's author Stephen Mogridge from two of his own stories for children.

The cast included Anita Harris, Reginald Marsh, Ronan O'Casey, Daphne Foreman, Malcolm Taylor, Thomas de Ville, Patrick Westwood, Dennis Adams, Neville Sarson and Gina Clow. The serial was produced by John Braybon and directed by Ian Curteis.

Cast 
 Anita Harris - Maureen
 Reginald Marsh – Inspector Foster
 Ronan O'Casey – The Chief
 Daphne Foreman – Patricia Deverill
 Paul Guess – Phil Deverill
 Malcolm Taylor - Joe
 Thomas de Ville – Ginger
 Monica Stewart – Mrs Guise
 Patrick Westwood – Mr Guise
 Michael Sarson – Freddie Guise
 Gina Clow – Fiona Guise
 Neville Barber - Pierre

References 

British children's television series
1960s British children's television series
1966 British television series debuts
1966 British television series endings
1960s British television miniseries